Helene Stähelin (18 July 1891 Wintersingen – 30 December 1970 Basel) was a Swiss mathematician, teacher, and peace activist. 
Between 1948 and 1967, she was president of the Swiss section of the Women's International League for Peace and Freedom and its representative in the Swiss Peace Council.

Early life and scientific work
She was one of twelve children of the parson Gustav Stähelin (1858–1934) and his wife Luise, née Lieb. In 1894, the family moved from Wintersingen to Allschwil.
Helene Stähelin attended the Töchterschule Basel and the Universities Basel and Göttingen.
In 1922, she became teacher of mathematics and natural sciences at the Töchterinstitut(de) in Ftan.
In 1924, she obtained her Dr.phil. degree
In 1926, she became a member of the Swiss Mathematical Society.
Between 1934 and 1956, Helene Stähelin worked as teacher at the Protestant secondary school in Zug.
After her pensioning she returned to Basel, where she assisted for several years to Otto Spiess' editing the Bernoulli family letters.

Political activism
Being a pacifist, Helene Stähelin committed herself to the Women's International League for Peace and Freedom (Internationale Frauenliga für Frieden und Freiheit, IFFF) and its struggle against scientific warfare.
She was president of the IFFF's Swiss section in 1947–1967, the main issues were the United Nations Organization, nuclear weapons, and the Vietnam War.
Due to her peace activism, she was watched by Swiss authorities in the mid 1950s,
Helene Stähelin also was active towards Women's suffrage in Switzerland. Although Stähelin herself never experienced the female vote.

See also
 List of peace activists

References

Swiss mathematicians
1891 births
1970 deaths
People from Basel-Stadt
Swiss women mathematicians
Swiss pacifists
Pacifist feminists
Anti–nuclear weapons activists
Anti–Vietnam War activists
Swiss women's rights activists
Women's rights in Switzerland